Uromyrtus is a genus of plants in the myrtle family Myrtaceae described as a genus in 1941. The greatest diversity of species are found in New Caledonia and the remainder are found in Australia, New Guinea and Borneo.

The flowers occur singly in the axils of the leaves and typically point downwards.  In this respect the genus superficially resembles the neotropical genus Ugni, but evidence from DNA sequencing studies suggests the genera are not closely related.

Uromyrtus australis A.J.Scott - an Australian species that is endangered and restricted to a small location in northern New South Wales. This plant is known as the peach myrtle due to the colour and shape of its fruit.

Species

References

External links
 Photograph of flowers of U. australis

Myrtaceae
Myrtaceae genera
Taxa named by Max Burret